False Bay is a bay of the Atlantic Ocean near Cape Town, South Africa.

False Bay can also refer to:
 False Bay (Livingston Island) on Livingston Island in the South Shetland Islands 
 False Bay, South Australia, a bay in South Australia
 False Bay, South Australia (locality), a locality in South Australia
 False Bay Park in iSimangaliso Wetland Park, KwaZulu-Natal, South Africa
 the former name of Allison Harbour on the Central Coast of British Columbia
 the former name of Lyall Bay in Wellington, New Zealand
 the former name of Mission Bay (San Diego) in San Diego, California